"Sexual Healing" is a song recorded by American singer Marvin Gaye from his seventeenth and final studio album, Midnight Love (1982). It was his first single since his exit from his long-term record label Motown earlier in the year, following the release of the In Our Lifetime (1981) album the previous year. It peaked at No. 3 on the Billboard Hot 100 (Gaye's final top 10 hit) and is listed at number 198 on Rolling Stone's list of 500 Greatest Songs of All Time. "Sexual Healing" is written and composed in the key of E-flat major and is set in time signature of common time with a tempo of 94 beats per minute.

Background
In the winter of 1981, Marvin Gaye had relocated to Ostend, Belgium, following the end of a European tour amid problems with the Internal Revenue Service and the end of his second marriage. Struggling with depression and cocaine addiction, Gaye had agreed to move to Ostend on the advice of longtime resident Freddy Cousaert. While in Ostend, Gaye began to curb his drug use and recover from his depression, partaking in Ostend's beaches. Gaye also began cutting ties with his longtime recording label, Motown, following the release of In Our Lifetime, an album he did not consider finished. He said that he would never record with Motown again, and accused it of betraying his creativity.

While still with Motown, Gaye had received offers from labels including I.R.S. Records, Arista Records and Elektra Records; afterward, he sought to make a deal with CBS Records after they offered him a contract. CBS agreed to sign him and help clear his financial debt, and spent a year negotiating. In the meantime, Gaye needed spending money, so Cousaert set him up with a month-long England tour between June 13 and July 1, 1981. The tour was called "A Heavy Love Affair Tour 1981", named after his song "Heavy Love Affair", from In Our Lifetime. After returning to Belgium that July, Gaye performed two shows at Ostend's Casino Kursaal on July 3 and 4, 1981. The tour's commercial and critical success further renewed Gaye's musical confidence.

Production
At the end of the tour, two of Gaye's musicians, Gordon Banks and Odell Brown, had decided to stay in Ostend as Gaye had been planning on new musical material after being exposed to reggae music while in England. With Brown and Banks, Gaye created and composed an instrumental track that featured reggae overtones, recorded in October 1981. Gaye used a Roland TR-808 drum machine to create the percussion; he was drawn to the instrument because he could use it to create music without other musicians or producers.

Gaye was still working on the track when David Ritz, then a reviewer for Rolling Stone, arrived at Ostend to locate Gaye, despite Gaye's and Couseart's rules that no music critic would be allowed to talk to the singer. The story has been disputed on how the lyrics to "Sexual Healing" were devised. Ritz claims that Gaye had been viewing sadomasochism comic books and advised Gaye he needed "sexual healing". When Ritz explained to Gaye what that meant, Gaye told him to "write a poem" while Gaye came up with the melody. However, Gaye's closest friends dispute this.

In an interview with HUMO in 1994, Cousaert claimed the only songwriters were Gaye and Brown and stated Ritz's contribution was the title. In Frankie Gaye's memoirs, My Brother, Marvin, the singer's brother claimed Ritz had told him, "not only are you sexy, your music is healing," inspiring Gaye to write the lyrics himself. Gordon Banks told The Atlantic in 2012 that the conversation between Gaye and Ritz had nothing to do with Marvin's S&M collection but because Gaye had been intrigued by Amsterdam's red light district, to which Ritz replied that Gaye needed sexual healing but said he had nothing to do with the creation of the song. Odell Brown stated he never met Ritz and assumed Ritz was just there for an interview for Rolling Stone. Though Gaye himself acknowledged Ritz for coming up with the song title, Ritz sued Gaye for $15 million for partial credit. Though Ritz was eventually credited after settling with Gaye's estate following his death, his case was dropped due to insufficient evidence in 1983.

Composition
"Sexual Healing" has been described as a post-disco, soul and funk song. It begins with a deep bass drum followed by "tinny" handclaps, "ticky" snare, and "tishy" hi-hats generated by a Roland TR-808 drum machine. The first vocal sounds are of whispers, recorded by singer Harvey Fuqua, an early mentor of Gaye who assisted him in production of the song and its parent album, Midnight Love. Fuqua whispers, "Get up" and "Wake up" four times respectively before the sounds of a rhythmic keyboard. Afterwards, Gaye sings an ad-lib before the first verse.

As Gaye sings the verses, background vocals (provided by Gaye and Gordon Banks) are heard singing, "heal me, my darlin'," while Gaye sings the lyrics. During the chorus, sounds of a harmonious synthesizer are heard before Gaye reaches a vocal bridge, that is led by Gaye and Gordon Banks providing a rhythm guitar solo. In the album version of the song, Fuqua's whispers are repeated in the middle of the song, in the single version, however, Gaye takes Fuqua's place, singing in part of Fuqua's words adding more lyrics before returning to the verse. Another bridge follows after the second repeat of the chorus. In different versions of the song, Gaye had added extra lyrics to the second bridge as showcased on the song's demo tape and on an alternate version of the song. Gaye eventually cut part of the lyrics off.

In the album version, Gaye and Banks' background vocals immediately come after the second bridge ends, but in the single version, Gaye repeats the vamp he had sung at the ending of the first bridge, this time with Fuqua's whispers added. The song ends with Gaye repeating the chorus line. As it fades out, Gaye can be heard singing, "please don't procrastinate, it's not good to masturbate."

Critical reception
In his review of Midnight Love for Rolling Stone, Dave Marsh described "Sexual Healing" as a track that was "sort of a polemic for the power of rampant humping." Blender described it as "the plaintively blue-balled model for basically every slow jam" since its release. An AllMusic reviewer stated Gaye had "concocted a pioneering percussive sound that was balladic in taste but stimulating in feel." In its end-year lists of 1982, Rolling Stone, NME, and The Village Voice listed it as one of the "songs of the year" with the latter two ranking it at number two. People described it as "America's hottest pop-culture turn-on" since Olivia Newton-John's single "Physical".

"Sexual Healing" won several music industry awards. At the 1983 Grammy Awards, the song won Gaye two Grammys, including Best Male R&B Vocal Performance and Best R&B Instrumental Performance. Gaye's performance of the song later made it into the compilation album, Grammy's Greatest Moments Volume I, in 1994. The American Music Awards recognized the track for Favorite Soul/R&B Single. "Sexual Healing" sold over two million units in its standard 45 RPM single format and was certified platinum by the Recording Industry Association of America. The digital sales of "Sexual Healing" reached 500,000 downloads and was certified as a gold single in 2005. Also issued as a mastertone, this format was certified platinum in 2007.

Chart performance
"Sexual Healing" reached number one on Billboards Hot R&B Singles chart, staying at the top spot for ten weeks. The success was similar on the Hot 100 where it peaked at number three, becoming his 18th and last top 10 hit. This peak at three made Gaye the second artist in the history of the Hot 100 chart (after Aretha Franklin) to have hit songs peak at each position from one to ten on the chart. The song also was a success on Billboards other component charts, reaching number 12 on the Hot Dance Club Play chart and number 34 on the Hot Adult Contemporary chart. The song reached number one on Canada's RPM chart.

It also peaked at number four on the UK Singles Chart and Australia's Kent Music Report. On Belgium's Ultratop 50 chart, the song reached number two. It also reached number one on New Zealand's RIANZ chart, where it stayed at the top spot for six weeks. It reached number three on the Dutch Top 40 in the Netherlands and also reached number seven on the Irish Singles Chart in Ireland. In other countries, success was more modest: West Germany's Media Control Charts, Switzerland's Swedish Singles Chart, and Italy's Italian Singles Chart, where it reached numbers 23, 17, and 37. It ultimately sold over four million worldwide.

Charts

Weekly charts
{|class="wikitable sortable"
!Chart (1982–1983)
!Peakposition
|-
|Australia (Kent Music Report)
|align="center"|4
|-

|-

|-
|Finland (Suomen virallinen lista)
|align="center"|12
|-
|France (IFOP)
|align="center"|17
|-

|-

|-

|-

|-

|-

|-
|US Billboard Hot 100
|align="center"|3
|-
|US Hot Adult Contemporary Tracks ([[Billboard (magazine)|Billboard]])
|align="center"|34
|-
|US Hot Black Singles (Billboard]])
|align="center"|1
|-
|US Hot Dance Club Play ([[Billboard (magazine)|Billboard)
|align="center"|12
|-
|US Cash Box Top 100
|align="center"|5
|-

|-
|}

Year-end charts

Certifications

Soul Asylum version

"Sexual Healing" was covered in 1993 by Minneapolis rock band Soul Asylum for the charity compilation No Alternative. Despite not being promoted as a single, the song managed to peak at number ten on the U.S. Modern Rock Tracks. It was included in the compilation Playlist: The Very Best of Soul Asylum.

Charts

Max-A-Million version
In 1995, American musical group Max-A-Million covered "Sexual Healing". Their version peaked at number 60 on the US Billboard Hot 100, number five in Australia, number four in New Zealand and number one on the Canadian RPM Dance chart.

Charts

Weekly charts

Year-end charts

Certifications

Sarah Connor version

In 2007, the song was covered by German singer Sarah Connor for her studio album of covers, Soulicious (2007). A re-recorded version featuring American singer Ne-Yo was released as the album's second single in 2007. On the same album, Connor performed a posthumous duet with Gaye entitled "Your Precious Love".

The song's music video is placed in the story of the 1986 erotic drama film 9½ Weeks, featuring representative scenes from the film, e.g. the well-known ice scene, Connor being fed by a Ne-Yo doppelgänger and her homemade striptease. Apart from the original film, this video is one of the few visual works that repeat the proem to the sex scene on the stairs in the rain. Ne-Yo was not available the day the music video was shot, so a doppelgänger was used. Connor stated that she was slightly drunk during the shoot of the video.

Track listing
European CD single
"Sexual Healing"  – 3:52
"Sexual Healing"  – 3:51

European CD maxi single
"Sexual Healing"  – 3:52
"Sexual Healing"  – 3:51
"Get It Right" – 4:20
"Sexual Healing"  – 4:04
Online Access: Making of "Sexual Healing"

Charts

Kygo remix

Norwegian DJ and record producer Kygo released a remix of "Sexual Healing" on SoundCloud on 21 November 2013. It was watched millions of times on YouTube.

The track was released as a single on April 27, 2015 by Ultra Music. The remix would later appear on the special-edition 12-inch single issued on Record Store Day 2018.

Charts

Other covers
Singer Michael Bolton covered the song for his 1999 album, Timeless: The Classics Vol. 2. His version peaked at number 28 on the US Adult Contemporary chart and at number 48 on the Canadian Adult Contemporary chart.

Remixes, samplings and interpolations
In 2001, "Sexual Healing" is interpolated by Joe on the song Let's Stay Home Tonight".

In 2005, "Sexual Healing" was sampled by Japanese singer-songwriter Miliyah Kato in her song "Dear Lonely Girl". The song charted at number 15 on the Oricon Singles Chart.

In 2007, this song was remixed by Alibi vs. Rockefeller with a music video featuring three female dancers dressed as nurses (Lauren Ridealgh, Bayley Darling, and Stephanie Fitzpatrick). It charted at number 16 on the Finnish Singles Chart and at number 34 on the UK Singles Chart.

Legacy
In 2003, Rolling Stone listed "Sexual Healing" at number 231 on its list of the 500 Greatest Songs of All Time. In the follow-up 2011 list, it dropped two places to number 233. In the 2021 list, it was ranked at number 198. Frequently included in best-of lists, the song ranked number 45 on Blender'''s list of their "Top 500 Songs Since You Were Born". It also ranked in several rock lists in Norway, Spain, the UK and the United States. It was also inducted to the Rock and Roll Hall of Fame as one of the 500 Songs that Shaped Rock and Roll.

See also
List of number-one R&B singles of 1982 (U.S.)
List of number-one singles of 1983 (Canada)
List of number-one singles from the 1980s (New Zealand)
List of RPM number-one dance singles of 1996

References

Bibliography

1982 songs
1982 singles
1993 singles
1995 singles
2007 singles
2015 singles
Arista Records singles
Columbia Records singles
Sony Music singles
Ultra Music singles
X-Cell Records singles
CBS Records singles
Kygo songs
Marvin Gaye songs
Michael Bolton songs
Ne-Yo songs
Number-one singles in New Zealand
Post-disco songs
RPM Top Singles number-one singles
Sarah Connor (singer) songs
Song recordings produced by Marvin Gaye
Songs written by Marvin Gaye
Songs written by Odell Brown
Soul Asylum songs